Manuel Dondé (1906 – 27 May 1976) was a Mexican film actor. He frequently played villains during his long film career.

Selected filmography

 La llorona (1933)
 Soulless Women (1934) - Policía
 El bastardo (1937)
 The Blood Stain (1937)
 El derecho y el deber (1938) - Antonio
 The Girls Aunt (1938) - Lechero
 The Coward (1939) - Minor Role (uncredited)
 The Cemetery of the Eagles (1939) - Sirviente (uncredited)
 La China Hilaria (1939) - Pueblerino (uncredited)
 Hombres del aire (1939)
 Los olvidados de Dios (1940) - Presidiario
 Los de abajo (1940) - Soldado federal deserter (uncredited)
 Allá en el Trópico (1940)
 El charro Negro (1940) - Hombre en cantina (uncredited)
 El jefe máximo (1940)
 Hombre o demonio (1940)
 Con su amable permiso (1940) - Empleado del periódico (uncredited)
 El Zorro de Jalisco (1941) - Chofer (uncredited)
 Creo en Dios (1941)
 Neither Blood nor Sand (1941) - Miembro cuadrilla (uncredited)
 Adios mi chaparrita (1941) - Vaquero
 El rápido de las 9.15 (1941) - Don Rodrigo (uncredited)
 Amor chinaco (1941)
 The Unknown Policeman (1941) - Amigo vagabundo (uncredited)
 La gallina clueca (1941) - Empleado de Ángel (uncredited)
 ¿Quién te quiere a tí? (1942) - Amigo de Milagros (uncredited)
 El barbero prodigioso (1942) - Pueblerino (uncredited)
 Allá en el bajio (1942) - (uncredited)
 Jesús de Nazareth (1942) - Testigo contra Jesús (uncredited)
 Silk, Blood and Sun (1942) - Espectador estadio (uncredited)
 El conde de Montecristo (1942) - (uncredited)
 Virgen de medianoche (1942)
 Caballería del imperio (1942)
 Simón Bolívar (1942) - Piar
 La venganza del Charro Negro (1942) - Hombre en cantina (uncredited)
 Los tres mosqueteros (1942) - Capitán (uncredited)
 The Saint Who Forged a Country (1942) - Sr. Azteca (uncredited)
 The Rock of Souls (1943) - Macario
 The Circus (1943) - (uncredited)
 La posada sangrienta (1943) - Orejano, mesero (uncredited)
 Morenita clara (1943) - Roque, mayordomo
 Wild Flower (1943) - Úrsulo Torres
 Tierra de pasiones (1943) - Rebelde (uncredited)
 Santa (1943) - Cliente burdel (uncredited)
 El misterioso señor Marquina (1943)
 Doña Bárbara (1943) - Carmelito López
 El rayo del sur (1943) - Valerio Trujano
 El hombre de la máscara de hierro (1943)
 Another Dawn (1943) - Gunman
 A Letter of Love (1943) - Soldado
 Divorced (1943) - Abogado
 Caminito alegre (1944) - Señor (uncredited)
 La vida inútil de Pito Pérez (1944) - Capitán (uncredited)
 Michael Strogoff (1944) - Tártaro
 Como todas las madres (1944)
 La corte de faraón (1944)
 Balajú (1944)
 El rey se divierte (1944)
 Rosa de las nieves (1944)
 Sota, caballo y rey (1944) - Tuerto
 Amok (1944) - Indigena (uncredited)
 Entre hermanos (1945)
 Nosotros (1945) - Marcelo (uncredited)
 Corazones de México (1945)
 Canaima (1945) - Cauchero (uncredited)
 La pajarera (1945) - Charol
 A Day with the Devil (1945)
 Caminos de sangre (1945) - Pedro Gómez (uncredited)
 La selva de fuego (1945) - Tuxpeño
 Symphony of Life (1946)
 Su última aventura (1946) - Hombre pelea con Raúl (uncredited)
 El ahijado de la muerte (1946) - José
 La Otra (1946) - Aguilar, policía
 Enamorada (1946) - Fidel Bernal
 Cuando lloran los valientes (1947) - Soldado
 Mujer (1947) - Detective policía (uncredited)
 Los cristeros (1947) - (uncredited)
 The Treasure of the Sierra Madre (1948) - El Jefe
 Río Escondido (1948) - El Rengo, esbirro de Regino
 El muchacho alegre (1948) - Sabino
 Algo flota sobre el agua (1948) - El zurdo
 Revenge (1948) - Gilberto Acosta
 Maclovia (1948) - Comisario (uncredited)
 Se la llevó el Remington (1948) - Santos
 Hermoso ideal (1948) - Charro (uncredited)
 La norteña de mis amores (1948)
 La vorágine (1949)
 Midnight (1949) - Melquiades
 Ahí viene Vidal Tenorio (1949)
 Pueblerina (1949) - Rómulo
 Rayito de luna (1949) - Tuerto
 The Unloved Woman (1949) - Juez de acordada
 El rencor de la tierra (1949)
 Callejera (1949) - Fidel Juárez
 La posesión (1950) - Don Santiago, presidente municipal
 Cuatro contra el mundo (1950) - El Lagarto
 La mujer que yo amé (1950) - Cliente cantina
 La edad peligrosa (1950) - Pedro Martínez
 Tacos joven (1950)
 El Cristo de mi Cabecera (1951) - Santiago
 Bodas de fuego (1951) - Panfilo
 María Montecristo (1951) - Lic. Suárez
 They Say I'm a Communist (1951) - Camarada Palomera
 El Suavecito (1951) - Esbirro del nene
 Todos son mis hijos!... (1951) - Román
 Con todo el corazón (1952) - Señor Ramírez
 Dos caras tiene el destino (1952) - Chiclero enfermo
 The Martyr of Calvary (1952) - Lázaro
 Passionflower (1952) - Prisionero
 Mexican Bus Ride (1952) - Eladio González
 Carne de presidio (1952) - El llorón
 Por ellas aunque mal paguen (1952) - El Cacomixtle
 El genial Detective Peter Pérez (1952)
 El cuarto cerrado (1952)
 Misericordia (1953) - Yuco
 Él (1953) - Pablo
 Frontera norte (1953)
 La Perversa (1954) - Fiscal
 Reto a la vida (1954) - Empleado (uncredited)
 Garden of Evil (1954) - Cantina Waiter (uncredited)
 El joven Juárez (1954) - Tío Bernardino
 La entrega (1954) - Doctor Medina (uncredited)
 Si volvieras a mi (1954)
 The River and Death (1954) - Zósimo Anguiano
 ¡Vaya tipos! (1955)
 El pueblo sin Dios (1955) - Jugador
 La mujer X (1955) - Leonardo
 La vida no vale nada (1955) - Carmelo
 The Criminal Life of Archibaldo de la Cruz (1955) - Colonel at wedding
 Secreto profesional (1955) - Ernesto
 Drop the Curtain (1955) - Detective de policía (uncredited)
 Los tres Villalobos (1955) - El tuerto
 The Last Frontier (1955) - Red Cloud (uncredited)
 La culpa de los hombres (1955) - Lorenzo
 El fantasma de la casa roja (1956) - Pedro Satan, administrador
 Los gavilanes (1956) - Esbirro asesina a José María
 The Hidden One (1956) - Tuerto (uncredited)
 Death in the Garden (1956) - Telegraph operator (uncredited)
 Policías y ladrones (1956) - Esbirro de chocholoco
 Amor y pecado (1956) - Agustín, padre Miguel
 La huella del chacal (1956) - (uncredited)
 Encrucijada (1956)
 Las medias de seda (1956) - Capataz
 Los amantes (1956)
 Juventud desenfrenada (1956) - Abortionista
 Legítima defensa (1957) - Agente ministerio público II
 Asesinos de la noche (1957) - El chueco
 Morir de pie (1957)
 The New World (1957)
 Swamp of the Lost Souls (1957) - Don Nacho Mendoza
 La justicia del gavilán vengador (1957)
 Secuestro diabolico (1957)
 Tu hijo debe nacer (1958) - Pedro, chofer
 Cabaret trágico (1958) - Mesero
 El látigo negro''' (1958) - El Moncho
 Un vago sin oficio (1958)
 El rayo de Sinaloa (La venganza de Heraclio Bernal) (1958) - Gonzalo Cárdenas
 La rebelión de la sierra (1958) - Gonzalo Landeros
 Raffles (1958) - Don Teófilo (uncredited)
 La odalisca No. 13 (1958) - (uncredited)
 El hombre que logró ser invisible (1958)
 Pulgarcito (1958) - Matías
 Ando volando bajo (1959)
 México nunca duerme (1959) - Caimán
 Sonatas (1959) - Campesino
 Los Tigres del ring (1960)
 El tesoro de Chucho el Roto (1960) - Federico Hinojosa
 Calibre 44 (1960) - Pancho, bandido (uncredited)
 Macario (1960) - Enviado de la inquisicion (uncredited)
 El impostor (1960) - Esbirro de Navarro
 El toro negro (1960) - Presidente municipal
 Luciano Romero (1960) - El tuerto, esbirro de Heraclio
 El gato (1961)
 Ellas también son rebeldes (1961) - Agente policía
 Limosneros con garrote (1961) - Dueño de patín de ruedas
 En carne propia (1961) - Velador ladrón
 Ay Chabela...! (1961)
 Juana Gallo (1961) - General Antonio Dávila (uncredited)
 Suicídate mi amor (1961) - Señor juez
 The Curse of Nostradamus (1961) - Dr. Camarena
 Escuela de valientes (1961) - Hombre en cantina (uncredited)
 Barú, el hombre de la selva (1962)
 Martín Santos el llanero (1962)
 Qué perra vida (1962) - El Picaflectos (uncredited)
 Espiritismo (1962) - Espiritualista (uncredited)
 Nostradamus y el destructor de monstruos (1962) - Miembro de la comisión (uncredited)
 El centauro del norte (1962)
 La moneda rota (1962)
 Cazadores de asesinos (1962) - (uncredited)
 La pantera de Monte Escondido (1962) - (uncredited)
 Los falsos héroes (1962)
 ¡En peligro de muerte! (1962) - Indio
 Genii of Darkness (1962) - Dr. Camarena
 Tlayucan (1962) - Mendigo ciego
 La sangre de Nostradamus (1962) - Dr. Camarena (uncredited)
 Dos gallos y dos gallinas (1963)
 Santo contra el cerebro diabólico (1963) - Carlos
 Sangre en la barranca (1963)
 Qué bonito es querer (1963)
 El beso de ultratumba (1963) - Doctor Mariscal
 El hombre de papel (1963) - (uncredited)
 México de mis recuerdos (1963) - Mayordomo
 Herencia maldita (1963) - Esbirro de Carlos
 Las bravuconas (1963)
 Un tipo a todo dar (1963) - Julio
 Torero por un día (1963)
 El río de las ánimas (1964) - El tuerto
 Furia en el Edén (1964)
 Frente al destino (1964)
 El Espadachín (1964)
 Wrestling Women vs. the Aztec Mummy (1964) - Dependiente de hotel (uncredited)
 The Golden Cockerel (1964) - Don Perfecto (uncredited)
 La edad de piedra (1964) - Spy
 El último cartucho (1965)
 El pueblo fantasma (1965) - Alejo, comisario
 Las lobas del ring (1965) - Arena Employee (uncredited)
 Rio Hondo (1965) - (uncredited)
 El rescate (1965)
 La conquista de El Dorado (1965)
 Mar sangriento (1965)
 Amor de adolescente (1965) - Vendedor de fotos
 Alma llanera (1965)
 Santo vs el estrangulador (1965) - Policía encubierto
 Los reyes del volante (1965) - (uncredited)
 Black Wind (1965) - Tata Lupe
 La Valentina (1966) - Revolucionario en el cementerio (uncredited)
 Tierra de violencia (1966)
 Espectro del estrangulador (1966)
 Duelo de pistoleros (1966)
 Los Sánchez deben morir (1966) - Cantinero
 Pacto de sangre (1966)
 Tiempo de morir (1966) - Barber
 Alazán y enamorado (1966) - Señor juez
 Cargamento prohibido (1966) - Don Pablo (uncredited)
 Juan Pistolas (1966)
 El indomable (1966) - (uncredited)
 La cigüeña distraída (1966) - Policia (uncredited)
 Los perversos (1967) - Tio de Tony (uncredited)
 Crisol (1967)
 La leyenda del bandido (1967) - Pancho
 Alma Grande en el desierto (1967)
 Nuestros buenos vecinos de Yucatán (1967) - Doctor
 El silencioso (1967) - Cantinero
 Mujeres, mujeres, mujeres (1967) - (segment "Amor y yoga")
 Operacion 67' (1967) - Police detective
 El escapulario (1968) - Gendarme
 Bajo el imperio del hampa (1968)
 Lucio Vázquez (1968) - Campesino en charreada (uncredited)
 La noche del halcón (1968) - Camilo
 La endemoniada (1968) - Doctor
 Blue Demon destructor de espias (1968) - (uncredited)
 Valentín de la Sierra (1968) - Sargento Paredes (uncredited)
 Los asesinos (1968) - Hombre asesinado
 El caballo Bayo (1969)
 Night of the Bloody Apes (1969) - Doctor (uncredited)
 No juzgarás a tus padres (1969)
 Memories of the Future (1969) - Félix
 El Libro de piedra (1969) - Bruno
 Una noche bajo la tormenta (1969)
 El ojo de vidrio (1969) - Catalino Zúñiga
 Mujeres de medianoche (1969) - Cura de pueblo (uncredited)
 Cazadores de espías (1969)
 Los siete proscritos (1969) - Jugador
 El último pistolero (1969)
 Estafa de amor (1970)
 La captura de Gabino Barrera (1970)
 Su precio... unos dólares (1970)
 La rebelion de las hijas (1970)
 La venganza de Gabino Barrera (1971)
 Para servir a usted (1971) - Grajales
 Jesús, nuestro Señor (1971) - (uncredited)
 Siete Evas para un Adan (1971) - Juez
 La casa del farol rojo (1971) - Agente policía (uncredited)
 Los Beverly de Peralvillo (1971) - El Tuerto (uncredited)
 El negocio del odio (1972)
 Tacos al carbón (1972) - Jefe de taller mecánico (uncredited)
 Tonta, tonta, pero no tanto (1972) - Tata Cruz
 ¡Qué familia tan cotorra! (1973) - Cliente restaurante (uncredited)
 Las cautivas (1973)
 The Holy Mountain (1973) - Wanderer (uncredited)
 Diamantes, oro, y amor (1973) - Señor juez
 Capulina contra las momias (El terror de Guanajuato) (1973) - El muerto
 Uno y medio contra el mundo (1973)
 Poor But Honest (1973) - Publicista (uncredited)
 El primer amor (1974)
 La muerte de Pancho Villa (1974)
 Los leones del ring contra la Cosa Nostra (1974) - (uncredited)
 Rapiña (1975) - Papá de Porfidio
 The Bricklayer (1975) - Velador (uncredited)
 De todos modos Juan te llamas (1976)
 Alucarda (1977) - Wagon Driver
 Cuartelazo'' (1977) - Jesús Fernández, boticario (final film role)

References

External links 
 

1906 births
1976 deaths
Mexican male film actors
People from Campeche